Rabbi Sholom Noach Berezovsky (August 18, 1911 – August 8, 2000) served as Slonimer Rebbe from 1981 until his death. A prolific writer, He is widely known for his teachings which are published as a series of books entitled Nesivos Sholom.

Through his writings he was among the most influential of contemporary chasidic rebbes, among chasidim and non-chasidim alike. A leading non-chasidic rosh yeshiva has referred to the  Nesivos Sholom as the "Mesillat Yesharim of our times". The statement, according to one understanding, refers to the impact of the respective religious works, each in their generation, rather than to the authors themselves.

Early life
Sholom Noach was born on August 18, 1911 (4 Av 5671 in the Hebrew calendar) in Baranavichy (today in Belarus), to Rabbi Moshe Avrohom Berezovsky and Tzvia Berezovsky. His father was the head of the local Jewish community. His mother was a granddaughter of Hillel Weinberg, a brother of the first Slonimer rebbe Rabbi Avraham Weinberg (author of the Yesod Ha'avodah).

Sholom Noach studied in the Slonimer yeshiva Toras Chessed in Baranovitsh. The rosh yeshiva, Rabbi Avrohom Shmuel Hirshovitz was a grandson of Rabbi Eliezer Gordon of Telz, and the mashgiach, Rabbi Moshe Midner, was a grandson of the Yesod Ho'Avoda and a student of Rabbi Chaim Soloveitchik; the Yeshiva thus combined the Lithuanian Talmudic style of the Misnagdic yeshivas with the Hasidic approach. In approximately 1930, the Slonimer Rebbe Rabbi Avraham Weinberg appointed Sholom Noach to commit to memory and subsequently write up the discourses which he (the Rebbe) delivered every Shabbos. These notes were subsequently published under the name Beis Avrohom.

By 1933 he had moved to Israel  and in that year married a daughter of Rabbi Avrohom Weinberg of Tiberias, (who would later to become Slonimer Rebbe, known as the Bircath Avrohom.

Rabbinic career
In 1940, Rabbi Sholom Noach was appointed rosh yeshiva of Achei Temimim, the Lubavitcher yeshiva in Tel Aviv. In 1941 he opened the Slonimer yeshiva in Jerusalem with just five students. On Friday nights rabbi Berezovsky would sit with the students for hours on end, teaching them the traditional Slonimer melodies.

The Slonim Hasidic dynasty was virtually wiped out in the Holocaust; the yeshiva in Jerusalem served as the focus for its revival. As part of his effort to rejuvenate Slonimer chasidus, Rabbi Sholom Noach was responsible for collecting the oral traditions ascribed to previous Slonimer rebbes (who did not commit their teachings to writing) in works such as Divrei Shmuel and Toras Ovos.

In 1954, Rabbi Berezovsky's father-in-law agreed to assume the mantle of the Rebbe. Rabbi Sholom Noach wrote up his discourses, too; they were subsequently published as Birkas Avrohom.

Rabbi Sholom Noach also authored many volumes of his own teachings, including his magnum opus, the seven-volume Nesivos Sholom (1982) as well as numerous smaller works on educational issues, marital harmony and other issues.

He succeeded his father-in-law as Slonimer Rebbe following the latter's death in 1981, serving in that capacity for almost twenty years. He is succeeded by his son, Rabbi Shmuel.

References

Sources
 Hamodia, August 18, 2000, p. 24 and Marbitzei Torah Me'olam Ha'chasidut Vol. I, p. 177 and Vol. III, p. 167, quoted in Hama'yan
 Responding to Loss with Leadership: Nesivos Shalom on the Holocaust, Weinberg, Tzipora. August 9,2016

Further reading
 Rebbe Avraham of Slonim, Yesod Ha'avodah

1911 births
2000 deaths
Belarusian Orthodox Jews
Hasidic rebbes
Israeli Hasidic rabbis
Israeli Rosh yeshivas
People from Baranavichy
People from Novogrudsky Uyezd
Slonim (Hasidic dynasty)